Air Marshal Sir Philip Clermont Livingston,  (2 March 1893 − 12 February 1982) was a physician, aviator, and a senior officer in the Royal Air Force who served as Director-General RAF Medical Services from 1948 to 1951.

Early life and education
Livingston was born in Cowichan, Vancouver Island, Canada. He was the son of Clermont Livingston (1850–1907) and his second wife Mary Ann née Jarvis (1854–1935). He went to the United Kingdom after the death of his father and gained his Bachelor of Medicine at Jesus College, Cambridge, where he also gained a rowing blue in 1914. After university he joined the Royal Naval Volunteer Reserve and served from 1914–19 as a surgeon probationer. In 1919 he joined the Medical Branch of the newly formed Royal Air Force (RAF) and continued his medical qualifications in public health, surgery and ophthalmology.

RAF career
In 1929 Livingston was posted by the RAF to Iraq as a General Surgeon. He worked at the Baghdad Eye Hospital and gained his wings as a pilot.

As a result of a tour of German military establishments in 1937 he made recommendations for improving the flying equipment and the evaluation of RAF pilots.

In 1947 Livingston was appointed Deputy Director General of Medical Services (RAF) and promoted to Director General a year later, a post he held until his retirement in 1951.

Livingston retired to Vancouver Island where he continued to practise ophthalmology; and wrote Fringe of the Clouds, his autobiography.

Family
Livingston's father, Clermont Livingston (1850–1907), was a great-grandson of Henry Brockholst Livingston and a brother of Edwin Brockholst Livingston. He first married in 1874 Mary Ellen née Clark (1842–1890) with whom he had three sons and three daughters. Clermont was a ship insurance broker. Shortly after Mary Ellen's death he met and married Mary Ann Jarvis They then moved to Cowichan in 1892 where Clermont was sent out by the Tyee Copper Company of London to manage the Tyee copper mine on Mount Sicker and a smelter

Notes

References

External links
 
 

1893 births
1982 deaths
Commanders of the Order of St John
Companions of the Order of the Bath
Knights Commander of the Order of the British Empire
Knights of the Holy Sepulchre
People from the Cowichan Valley Regional District
Recipients of the Air Force Cross (United Kingdom)
Royal Air Force air marshals